Jakub Markovič (born 13 July 2001) is a professional Czech football goalkeeper currently playing for FK Pardubice on loan from Slavia Prague.

Career

Club
Markovič made his debut for Slavia Prague on 24 August 2019 in a 4-0 Czech First League game against Bohemians 1905, becoming the second youngest goalkeeper to debut for Slavia, and the youngest to keep a clean sheet.

International
On 24 May 2016, Markovič made his debut for the Czech Republic U15, going on to represent them at U16, U17, U18 and U19.

Career statistics

Club

Honours

 SK Slavia Prague
Czech First League: 2019–20
Czechoslovak Supercup: 2019

References

External links 
 
 Jacob Markovic

2001 births
Living people
Czech footballers
Association football goalkeepers
Czech First League players
SK Slavia Prague players
Czech Republic youth international footballers
FK Mladá Boleslav players